Peko Nakano (born 10 March 1965) is a Japanese beach volleyball player. She competed in the women's tournament at the 1996 Summer Olympics.

References

External links
 

1965 births
Living people
Japanese women's beach volleyball players
Olympic beach volleyball players of Japan
Beach volleyball players at the 1996 Summer Olympics
Sportspeople from Tokyo